Oskaloosa is a city in and the county seat of Jefferson County, Kansas, United States.  As of the 2020 census, the population of the city was 1110.

History
Oskaloosa was founded in 1856. It was named after the city of Oskaloosa, Iowa.  The first post office in Oskaloosa  was established in November 1856.

In 1888, Oskaloosa citizens elected Mary D. Lowman mayor with a city council composed entirely of women, making the city the first in the state to elect an all-women city administration.

Geography
Oskaloosa is located at  (39.215849, -95.313800). It is at the intersection of U.S. Route 59 and K-92, approximately 15 miles north of Lawrence.

Climate
The climate in this area is characterized by hot, humid summers and generally cold winters.  According to the Köppen Climate Classification system, Oskaloosa has a humid subtropical climate, abbreviated "Cfa" on climate maps.

Demographics

Oskaloosa is part of the Topeka, Kansas Metropolitan Statistical Area.

2010 census
As of the census of 2010, there were 1,113 people, 435 households, and 281 families living in the city. The racial makeup of the city was 97.0% White, 0.2% African American, 0.8% Native American, 0.3% Asian, 0.1% from other races, and 1.6% from two or more races. Hispanic or Latino of any race were 0.9% of the population.

There were 435 households, of which 33.1% had children under the age of 18 living with them, 43.2% were married couples living together, 16.8% had a female householder with no husband present, 4.6% had a male householder with no wife present, and 35.4% were non-families. 29.2% of all households were made up of individuals, and 14.5% had someone living alone who was 65 years of age or older. The average household size was 2.43 and the average family size was 3.03.

The median age in the city was 39.3 years. 24.5% of residents were under the age of 18; 9% were between the ages of 18 and 24; 23.1% were from 25 to 44; 24.8% were from 45 to 64; and 18.4% were 65 years of age or older. The gender makeup of the city was 50.3% male and 49.7% female.

2000 census
As of the census of 2000, there were 1,165 people, 439 households, and 291 families living in the city. The racial makeup of the city was 98.03% White, 0.52% Native American, 0.69% from other races, and 0.77% from two or more races. Hispanic or Latino of any race were 1.97% of the population.

There were 439 households, out of which 35.8% had children under the age of 18 living with them, 49.7% were married couples living together, 11.6% had a female householder with no husband present, and 33.5% were non-families. 29.8% of all households were made up of individuals, and 15.5% had someone living alone who was 65 years of age or older. The average household size was 2.53 and the average family size was 3.14.

In the city, the population was spread out, with 28.3% under the age of 18, 8.7% from 18 to 24, 26.0% from 25 to 44, 18.4% from 45 to 64, and 18.6% who were 65 years of age or older. The median age was 37 years. For every 100 females, there were 94.2 males. For every 100 females age 18 and over, there were 87.6 males.

The median income for a household in the city was $33,684, and the median income for a family was $41,477. Males had a median income of $35,043 versus $23,295 for females. The per capita income for the city was $15,677. About 9.8% of families and 13.5% of the population were below the poverty line, including 14.4% of those under age 18 and 9.4% of those age 65 or over.

Education
Oskaloosa is served by Oskaloosa Community School District, which has a high school, middle school, and elementary school.

Media
Oskaloosa is the host of The Oskaloosa Independent, the official newspaper of Jefferson County and publishes weekly on Thursdays. The Independent was founded by J.W. Roberts, the great grandfather of Sen. Pat Roberts. The masthead says The Independent was established in 1860 and is six months older than the state of Kansas. The Independent is currently owned by Davis Publications, which also owns The Valley Falls Vindicator. Holly Allen is the managing editor and Wesley Cudney is the main reporter covering the East side of Jefferson County.

Notable people
 Roger Barker, pioneering sociologist who studied everyday life in Oskaloosa.
 McKinley Burnett, leading figure in Brown v. Board of Education.
 James Reynolds, actor on Days of Our Lives for over 30 years.
 C. Wesley Roberts, chairman of the Republican Party, father of U.S. Senator Pat Roberts.
 Dummy Taylor, deaf Major League Baseball pitcher.

References

Further reading

External links

 City of Oskaloosa
 Oskaloosa - Directory of Public Officials
 USD 341, local school district
 Oskaloosa City Map, KDOT

Cities in Jefferson County, Kansas
Cities in Kansas
County seats in Kansas
Topeka metropolitan area, Kansas
Populated places established in 1856
1856 establishments in Kansas Territory